Guillermo Alexis Beltrán Paredes (born June 25, 1984), known as Guillermo Beltrán, is a Paraguayan footballer who is currently playing for Club Nacional.

Teams
 Independiente de Campo Grande 2005
 Nacional 2006–2007
 12 de Octubre 2008
 Nacional 2009–2010
 Once Caldas 2011
 Cerro Porteño 2012–2017
 Vitória 2014–2015 (loan)
 Guarani 2017–
 Avaí 2018–

Titles
 Nacional 2009 (Torneo Clausura Paraguayan Primera División Championship)
 Cerro Porteño 2012 (Torneo Clausura Paraguayan Primera División Championship)

Notes

External links
 
 

1984 births
Living people
Paraguayan footballers
Paraguayan expatriate footballers
Paraguay international footballers
Paraguayan Primera División players
Categoría Primera A players
Campeonato Brasileiro Série A players
Campeonato Brasileiro Série B players
Independiente F.B.C. footballers
12 de Octubre Football Club players
Club Nacional footballers
Cerro Porteño players
Once Caldas footballers
Avaí FC players
Deportivo Santaní players
Esporte Clube Vitória players
Paraguayan expatriate sportspeople in Brazil
Paraguayan expatriate sportspeople in Colombia
Expatriate footballers in Brazil
Expatriate footballers in Colombia
Association football forwards